Oreophysa is a genus of flowering plants in the legume family, Fabaceae. It belongs to the subfamily Faboideae. The first species in this genus to be discovered, in 1843 by H. F. Jaubert & E. Spach, was initially mis-classified as belonging to a different genus. However as it differed in suffruticose growth, and other characteristics so was later identified as belonging to a different species, to be named Oreophysa.

References

Galegeae
Fabaceae genera